The following is a list of Radford Highlanders men's basketball seasons. Representing Radford University in Radford, Virginia, the Highlanders compete in the Big South Conference of the NCAA Division I and are currently led by head coach Mike Jones. They play their home games out of the 3,000-seat Dedmon Center, their home since 1981. Radford has won four Big South regular season championships, two Big South tournament championships, and has appeared in two NCAA tournaments, the most recent of which came in 2009. They also appeared in the 2014 College Basketball Invitational (CBI), where they upset Oregon State in the first round before falling to Old Dominion in the quarterfinals.

Seasons

Statistics
Statistics correct as of the end of the 2020–21 NCAA Division I men's basketball season

References

 
Radford
Radford Highlanders basketball seasons